Okrug is a municipality located on the western side of the island of Čiovo, Croatia. It is divided into Okrug Gornji (Upper Okrug) and Okrug Donji (Lower Okrug), two traditional Dalmatian villages. Newly built holiday homes and hotels along the island's coast have linked Trogir and Okrug Gornji into a continuous urban and suburban area. Okrug Gornji is a traditional fishing harbor at the end of a beach, while Okrug Donji remains a separate village further west. The region has a mild Mediterranean climate, dense subtropical and Mediterranean vegetation, an archipelago of little islands, little bays and beaches. 

There are many restaurants and taverns in Okrug Gornji and Donji with a varied choice of original Dalmatian specialities.

Okrug is claimed to be one of the most attractive tourist destinations in Croatia with its 2,670 hours of sunshine per year.

References

External links

Okrug Gornji Tourist Info

Populated places in Split-Dalmatia County